
Laguna Bahia Toco Largo is a lake in the José Miguel de Velasco Province, Santa Cruz Department, Bolivia. At an elevation of 165 m, its surface area is 6.5 km².

Lakes of Santa Cruz Department (Bolivia)